Lak Tarash (also Romanized as Lāk Tarāsh and Lākterāsh) is a village in Peyrajeh Rural District, in the Central District of Neka County, Mazandaran Province, Iran. At the 2006 census, its population was 473, in 113 families.

References 

Populated places in Neka County